Jack Island is an island in the U.S. state of Georgia.

Jack Island was named after Jack Lee, a pioneer settler.

References

Landforms of Ware County, Georgia
Islands of Georgia (U.S. state)